Pak Yong-mi (born 8 February 1991) is a North Korean sport wrestler who competes in the women's freestyle category and a current world champion in the women's 53kg Freestyle event. She won the gold medal in the women's 53 kg event during the 2019 World Wrestling Championships. She also qualified to represent North Korea at the 2020 Summer Olympics in Tokyo, Japan following the gold medal success at the 2019 World Wrestling Championships. However, in June 2021, North Korea withdrew from the 2020 Summer Olympics which meant that Luisa Valverde of Ecuador will compete instead.

References 

1991 births
Living people
North Korean female sport wrestlers
World Wrestling Championships medalists
Wrestlers at the 2014 Asian Games
Wrestlers at the 2018 Asian Games
Asian Games gold medalists for North Korea
Asian Games medalists in wrestling
Medalists at the 2018 Asian Games
Asian Wrestling Championships medalists